Mamadie Touré is the widow and youngest of Lansana Conté's, the former president of Guinea, four wives.

Her name appears in numerous investigations into the activities of Pentler Holdings, who is said to have transferred through a network of shell companies at least one payment of $2.4 million US—with more pledged—to her offshore company, Matinda, in return for her help obtaining a concession in Simandou mine from her husband shortly before his death.

References 

First ladies of Guinea
People named in the Panama Papers
Year of birth missing (living people)
Living people
Corruption in Africa